is a railway station in the town of Watari, Miyagi Prefecture, Japan, operated by the East Japan Railway Company (JR East).

Lines

Station layout
The station has two opposed side platforms connected to the station building by a footbridge. The station has a Midori no Madoguchi staffed ticket office.

Platforms

History
Watari Station opened on 10 November 1897. The station was absorbed into the JR East network upon the privatization of the Japanese National Railways (JNR) on 1 April 1987. The station building was rebuilt in 2008 in the form of a faux Japanese castle, and incorporates the Watari Town Library and the Watari Local History Museum.

Passenger statistics
In fiscal 2018, the JR East portion of the station was used by an average of 2,130 passengers daily (boarding passengers only). The

Surrounding area
Watari Town Hall
 Watari Post Office

See also
 List of Railway Stations in Japan

References

External links

  

Railway stations in Miyagi Prefecture
Jōban Line
Railway stations in Japan opened in 1897
Watari, Miyagi